Mohamed Banka (born 24 September 1984) is a retired Tanzanian football midfielder.

References

1984 births
Living people
Tanzanian footballers
Tanzania international footballers
Moro United F.C. players
Young Africans S.C. players
Simba S.C. players
Coastal Union F.C. players
Mwadui United F.C. players
Friends Rangers F.C. players
Association football midfielders
Tanzanian Premier League players